Vogtei is a former municipal association (Verwaltungsgemeinschaft) in the district Unstrut-Hainich-Kreis in Thuringia, Germany. The seat of the association was in Oberdorla. It was disbanded on 31 December 2012.

The Verwaltungsgemeinschaft Vogtei consisted of five municipalities:
Oberdorla, 
Kammerforst, 
Langula, 
Niederdorla, and 
Oppershausen.

Former Verwaltungsgemeinschaften in Thuringia